Maksym Oleksiyovych Lisovyi (born 21 May 1985), is a professional Ukrainian football midfielder who plays in Ukrainian amateur leagues.

Career
Maksym Lisovyi spent his career as a player in several clubs of the Ukrainian First League and the Ukrainian Second League. In his later years, when he played for PFC Sevastopol, he was loaned from February 2011 to Belarusian club FC Belshina

References

External links 
 
 
 
 

1985 births
Living people
Ukrainian footballers
Association football midfielders
Ukrainian expatriate footballers
Expatriate footballers in Belarus
FC Dnipro Cherkasy players
FC Borysfen Boryspil players
FC Zorya Luhansk players
FC Volyn Lutsk players
FC Sevastopol players
FC Belshina Bobruisk players
FC Gomel players
FC Dinamo Minsk players
FC Dnepr Mogilev players
FC Poltava players
FC Cherkashchyna players
FC Kremin Kremenchuk players
PFC Sumy players
Sportspeople from Cherkasy
21st-century Ukrainian people